Landouzy may refer to:

People
Louis Théophile Joseph Landouzy, French neurologist

Places
France
Landouzy-la-Cour, commune in the Aisne department
Landouzy-la-Ville, commune in the Aisne department

See also
Facioscapulohumeral muscular dystrophy, originally called Landouzy-Dejerine